Nonlinear narrative is a storytelling technique in which the events are depicted, for example, out of chronological order, or in other ways where the narrative does not follow the direct causality pattern of the events featured, such as parallel distinctive plot lines, dream immersions, flashbacks, flashforwards or narrating another story inside the main plot-line.

In television, there are several examples of works that use this kind of narrative, although not all of them use it in the same way. In spite of it being more commonly used on dramas, it can also be found on comedies.

This technique is used for different purposes, such as serving as a narrative hook, to mimic human memory or to explore the past of the story without leaving its present completely aside. In addition, not all television series use this technique in the same extent; some of them use it only in certain episodes, e.g. Fringe, others only in certain seasons, e.g. Breaking Bad, while others do throughout their entire run, e.g. Lost.

1950s

1980s

1990s

2000s

2010s

2010

2011

2012

2013

2014

2015

2016

2017

2018

2019

2020s

2020

2021

2022

See also
 Nonlinear narrative § Television
 List of nonlinear narrative films

References

Lists of television series